The New South Wales Z15 class was a class of 4-4-0 steam locomotives operated by the New South Wales Government Railways of Australia.

In 1882/83, Beyer, Peacock & Company built six 4-4-0 locomotives to operate passenger services on the newly extended  Main Southern line to Albury. All were fitted with Belpaire boilers in 1902/03.
 All were scrapped between 1929 and 1937.

References

Externak links

Beyer, Peacock locomotives
Railway locomotives introduced in 1882
Standard gauge locomotives of Australia
15
4-4-0 locomotives